The .45-75 Winchester Centennial is a centerfire rifle cartridge developed in 1876 for the newly designed Winchester Model 1876 Centennial lever-action rifle. Winchester Repeating Arms Company introduced the rifle and cartridge at the United States Centennial Exposition. The Model 1876 rifle used an enlarged version of the famous Winchester Model 1873 action to offer a lever-action repeating rifle using cartridges suitable for big-game hunting. The cartridge and rifle enjoyed brief popularity with Gilded Age American hunters including Theodore Roosevelt, and was issued to the Canadian North-West Mounted Police and to Texas Rangers.

Description

Early Winchester ammunition boxes suggested reloading empty cartridge cases with government musket powder or with American Powder Company Deadshot Fg, Hazard Powder Company Sea Shooting Fg, DuPont Rifle FFg, Oriental Powder Company Western Sporting Fg, Laflin & Rand Orange Rifle Fg, or Austin Powder Company Rifle Powder FFg. Boxes also recommended casting bullets from an alloy of one part tin and sixteen parts lead and lubricating bullets with Japan wax or tallow.

The .45-75 was shorter and fatter than the .45-70 government cartridge. Although the .45-75 was nominally superior to the popular .45-70, the weak toggle-link action with its elevator-style carrier originally designed for handgun cartridges limited the ability of the Model 1876 rifle to safely fire higher pressure loads intended for stronger actions. Within a decade, the Model 1876's advantage of faster loading for subsequent shots was eclipsed by the stronger and smoother Winchester Model 1886 action capable of handling longer cartridges, including the .45-70 with varying lengths for 300 and 500 grain bullets. 

The Kennedy lever-action rifle manufactured by Whitney Arms Company was also chambered for the .45-75. The .45-75 and similarly short .40-60 Winchester, .45-60 Winchester, and .50-95 Winchester Express cartridges designed for the Model 1876 rifle faded into obsolescence as 20th-century hunters preferred more powerful smokeless powder loadings of longer cartridges designed for stronger rifles. Winchester production of .45-75 cartridges ended during the Great Depression.

Dimensions

See also 
 List of Winchester Center Fire cartridges
 Table of handgun and rifle cartridges
 List of cartridges by caliber
 List of rifle cartridges
 .44-40 Winchester
 .444 Marlin
 .44 Henry
 .450 No 2 Nitro Express

References

External links

 .45-75 Winchester (Centennial) 
 Case Histories: .45-75 WCF
 Handloading the .45-75 WCF
 

Pistol and rifle cartridges
Guns of the American West